Donald Edward Collins (September 15, 1952 – May 22, 2022) was a Major League Baseball pitcher who played for two seasons. He played for the Atlanta Braves in 1977 and the Cleveland Indians in 1980.

He attended South Georgia State College.

Post-retirement 
After retirement, he owned a barbershop in Newnan, Georgia. 

He died of cancer on May 22, 2022.

References

External links

1952 births
2022 deaths
Atlanta Braves players
Cleveland Indians players
Baseball players from Georgia (U.S. state)
South Georgia Tigers baseball players
People from Lyons, Georgia
Major League Baseball pitchers
Wytheville Braves players
Greenwood Braves players
Savannah Braves players
Richmond Braves players
Tacoma Tigers players
Charleston Charlies players
Chattanooga Lookouts players
Birmingham Barons players